Pricetown is a village in Ruscombmanor Township, Pennsylvania, United States, in Berks County. It is 10 miles from downtown Reading at the intersection of Pennsylvania Route 12 and Pennsylvania Route 662, and is served by the Oley Valley School District.

References

External links

Unincorporated communities in Berks County, Pennsylvania
Unincorporated communities in Pennsylvania